António Fernandes (18 June 1935 – 2 January 1992), known as Yaúca, was a former Portuguese footballer who played as forward.

In the summer of 1970 he played abroad in Canada's National Soccer League with Toronto First Portuguese. In his debut season with Toronto he assisted in securing the NSL Cup by scoring a goal against Toronto Hellas.

Career 
Yaúca gained 10 caps and scored 4 goals for Portugal. He made his debut 11 November 1959 in Paris against France, in a 3–5 defeat.

References

External links 
 
 
 

1935 births
Portuguese footballers
Association football forwards
Primeira Liga players
C.F. Os Belenenses players
S.L. Benfica footballers
Toronto First Portuguese players
Canadian National Soccer League players
Portugal international footballers
Portuguese expatriate footballers
Expatriate soccer players in Canada
Portuguese expatriate sportspeople in Canada
1992 deaths